Omiodes hallwachsae is a moth in the family Crambidae. It was described by Patricia Gentili-Poole and Maria Alma Solis in 1998. It is found in Costa Rica. It was named in honor of biologist Winifred Hallwachs.

References

Moths described in 1998
hallwachsae